Jamie Vaughn Westbrook (born June 18, 1995) is an American professional baseball outfielder and second baseman in the New York Yankees organization. He was drafted by the Arizona Diamondbacks in the fifth round of the 2013 Major League Baseball draft. He played for the United States national baseball team in the 2020 Summer Olympics.

Career

Amateur career
Westbrook grew up in Chandler, Arizona, and attended Basha High School. As a junior, he batted .532 with 35 RBIs and 13 home runs. Westbrook hit .434 with 16 total extra-base hits and six home runs in his senior season. Westbrook had committed to play college baseball at Pepperdine University before signing with the Diamondbacks.

Arizona Diamondbacks
The Arizona Diamondbacks selected Westbrook in the fifth round, with the 150th overall selection, of the 2013 Major League Baseball draft. He made his professional debut with the AZL Diamondbacks, and also appeared for the rookie-level Missoula Osprey. In 2014, Westbrook played for the Single-A South Bend Silver Hawks, hitting .259/.314/.375 with 8 home runs and 49 RBI. The following season, Westbrook played for the High-A Visalia Rawhide, where he batted .319/.357/.510 with career-highs in home runs (17) and RBI (72). For the 2016 season, Westbrook played for the Double-A Mobile BayBears, logging a .262/.312/.349 slash line with 5 home runs and 36 RBI. In 2017, Westbrook played for the Double-A Jackson Generals, where he slashed .265/.305/.395 with 8 home runs and 55 RBI in 104 games.

In 2018, Westbrook was named a Southern League All-Star after batting .287 with 15 home runs and was promoted to the Triple-A Reno Aces, where he hit .391 with four home runs in seven games. He returned to Jackson to start the 2019 season and repeated as a Southern League All-Star and was again promoted to Reno. On November 4, 2019, he elected free agency.

San Francisco Giants
On January 6, 2020, Westbrook signed a minor league contract with the San Francisco Giants organization. Westbrook did not play in a game in 2020 due to the cancellation of the minor league season because of the COVID-19 pandemic. Westbrook was released by the Giants organization on June 26.

Sugar Land Lightning Sloths
In July 2020, Westbrook signed on to play for the Sugar Land Lightning Sloths of the Constellation Energy League, a makeshift four-team independent league created as a result of the COVID-19 pandemic, for the 2020 season. Westbrook hit .294/.347/.553 with five home runs and 18 RBI in 27 games, and was named the MVP of his team after the season.

Milwaukee Brewers
On November 2, 2020, Westrook signed a minor league contract with the Milwaukee Brewers organization. He was assigned to the Triple-A Nashville Sounds to start the 2021 season, but was later reassigned to the Double-A Biloxi Shuckers before being promoted back to Triple-A.

Detroit Tigers
On April 13, 2022, the Brewers traded Westbrook to the Detroit Tigers for cash considerations. The Tigers assigned Westbrook to the Triple-A Toledo Mud Hens. He elected free agency on November 10, 2022.

New York Yankees
On December 15, 2022, Westrook signed a minor league contract with the New York Yankees.

International career
On July 2, 2021, Westbrook was named to the roster for the United States national baseball team for the 2020 Summer Olympics, contested in 2021 in Tokyo. The team went on to win silver, falling to Japan in the gold-medal game.

References

External links

Minor league baseball players
Living people
1995 births
People from Gilbert, Arizona
Baseball players from Arizona
Arizona League Diamondbacks players
Missoula Osprey players
South Bend Silver Hawks players
Visalia Rawhide players
Sydney Blue Sox players
Mobile BayBears players
Salt River Rafters players
Jackson Generals (Texas League) players
Reno Aces players
Mayos de Navojoa players
Nashville Sounds players
Biloxi Shuckers players
Baseball players at the 2020 Summer Olympics
United States national baseball team players
Olympic baseball players of the United States
Medalists at the 2020 Summer Olympics
Olympic silver medalists for the United States in baseball
American expatriate baseball players in Mexico
Toledo Mud Hens players